Jharia coalfield is a large coal field located in the east of India in Jharia, Jharkhand. Jharia represents the largest coal reserves in India having estimated reserves of 19.4 billion tonnes of coking coal. The coalfield is an important contributor to the local economy, employing much of the local population either directly or indirectly.

The fields have suffered a coal bed fire since at least 1916, resulting in 37 millions tons of coal consumed by the fire, and significant ground subsidence and water and air pollution in local communities including the city of Jharia. The resulting pollution has led to a government agency designated for moving local populations, however, little progress has been made in the relocation.

Coal field
The coal field lies in the Damodar River Valley, and covers about 110 square miles (280 square km), and produces bituminous coal suitable for coke. Most of India's coal comes from Jharia. Jharia coal mines are India's most important storehouse of prime coke coal used in blast furnaces, it consists of 23 large underground and nine large open cast mines.

History
The mining activities in these coalfields started in 1894 and had really intensified in 1925. The first Indians to arrive and break monopoly of British in Coal mining were Gujarati railway contractors from  Kutch some of whom decided to plunge into the coal mining business and were thus the pioneers in starting coal mining in Jharia coalfields belt around 1890–95.  In Jharia-Dhanbad belt Seth Khora Ramji Chawda  was the first Indian to break monopoly of Europeans and founded Khas Jharia, Golden Jharia, Fatehpur, Balihari, Khas Jeenagora,East Bagatdih Collieries with their brothers Teja Ramji Chawda, Jetha Lira Jethwa, Akhoy Ramji Chawda, Pachan Ramji Chowra between 1894 and 1910. In Pure Jharia Colliery Khora Ramji and brothers were partners with Diwan Bahadur D.D. Thacker.

 The Encyclopaedia of Bengal, Bihar & Orissa (1920) by British Gazetteer mentions about Seth Khora Ramji as under :-

The life sketch of Govamal Jivan Chauhan is also another miner mentioned by the British in Gazetteer who founded collieries at Teesra, Budroochuck and Pandeberra around 1908–10, Jagmal Raja Chauhan owned Rajapore colliery with Manji Jeram of Madhapar, while Khimji Walji owned Tisra mines The migrants took on lease the coal mining fields from Raja of Jharia at various locations to start collieries at Khas Jharia, Jamadoba, Balihari, Tisra, Katrasgarh, Kailudih, Kusunda, Govindpur, Sijua, Sijhua, Loyabad, Joyrampur, Bhaga, Matadih, Mohuda, Dhansar, Bhuli, Bermo, Mugma, Chasnala-Bokaro, Bugatdih, Putki, Pandibri, Rajapur, Jeenagora, Gareria, Chirkunda, Bhowrah, Sinidih, Kendwadih, Dumka, etc.

Coal field fire 

Jharia is famous for a coal field fire that has burned underground for nearly a century.  A 2007 estimate, described 37 million tons of coal consumed by the fires since their start.

The first fire was detected in 1916. According to records, it was the Khas Jharia mines of Seth Khora Ramji Chawda (1860–1923), who was a pioneer of Indian coalmines, whose mines were one of the firsts to collapse in underground fire in 1930.  Two of his collieries, Khas Jharia and Golden Jharia, which worked on maximum 260-foot-deep shafts, collapsed due to now infamous underground fires, in which their house and bungalow also collapsed on 8 November 1930, causing 18 feet subsidence and widespread destruction.  The fire never stopped despite sincere efforts by mines department and railway authorities and in 1933 flaming crevasses lead to exodus of many residents.  The 1934 Nepal–Bihar earthquake led to further spread of fire and by 1938 the authorities had declared that there is raging fire beneath the town with 42 collieries out of 133 on fire.

In 1972, more than 70 mine fires were reported in this region.  As of 2007, more than 400,000 people who live in Jharia are living on land in danger of subsidence due to the fires, and according to Satya Pratap Singh, "Jharia township is on the brink of an ecological and human disaster". The government has been criticized for a perceived lackadaisical attitude towards the safety of the people of Jharia. Heavy fumes emitted by the fires lead to severe health problems such as breathing disorders and skin diseases among the local population.

References

Bibliography
 Reinventing Jharia Coalfield. Edited by N.C. Saxena, Gurdeep Singh, K.N. Singh and B.N. Pan. Jodhpur, Scientific, 2005, vi, 246 p.. .
 
  
  
 
   
 eBook about the Jharia Coalfields, Zipfel, Isabell https://www.amazon.com/The-Jharia-Coalfields-ebook/dp/B0095I2AH4
 "Solar, Eclipsed: Coal? or the Sun? The Power Source India Chooses May Decide the Fate of the Entire Planet." By Charles C. Mann.  Wired, November 2015.  https://www.wired.com/2015/11/climate-change-in-india/

External links
 
 
 
 

Coalfields of India
Mining in Jharkhand